Swedish cuisine is the traditional food of Sweden. Due to Sweden's large north-to-south expanse, there are regional differences between the cuisine of North and South Sweden.

Historically, in the far north, meats such as reindeer, and other (semi-)game dishes were eaten, some of which have their roots in the Sami culture, while fresh vegetables have played a larger role in the South. Many traditional dishes employ simple, contrasting flavours, such as the traditional dish of meatballs and brown cream sauce with tart, pungent lingonberry jam (slightly similar in taste to cranberry sauce).

Swedes have traditionally been very open to foreign influences, ranging from French cuisine during the 17th and 18th centuries, to the sushi and caffé latte of today.

General features 
Swedish cuisine could be described as centered around cultured dairy products, crisp and soft (often sugared) breads, berries and stone fruits, beef, chicken, lamb, pork, eggs, and seafood. Potatoes are often served as a side dish, often boiled. Swedish cuisine has a wide variety of breads of different shapes and sizes, made of rye, wheat, oat, white, dark, sourdough, and whole grain, and including flatbreads and crispbreads. There are many sweetened bread types and some use spices. Many meat dishes, especially meatballs, are served with lingonberry jam. Fruit soups with high viscosity, like rose hip soup and blueberry soup (blåbärssoppa) served hot or cold, are typical of Swedish cuisine. Butter and margarine are the primary fat sources, although olive oil is becoming more popular. Sweden's pastry tradition features a variety of yeast buns, cookies, biscuits and cakes; many of them are in a very sugary style and often eaten with coffee (fika).

History 
The importance of fish has governed Swedish population and trade patterns far back in history. For preservation, fish were salted and cured. Salt became a major trade item at the dawn of the Scandinavian middle ages, which began  1000 AD. Cabbage preserved as sauerkraut and various kinds of preserved berries, apples, and other fruit were used once as a source of vitamin C during the winter (today sauerkraut is very seldom used in Swedish cuisine). Lingonberry jam, still a favourite, may be the most traditional and typical Swedish way to add freshness to sometimes rather heavy food, such as steaks and stews.

Sweden's long winters explain the lack of fresh vegetables in many traditional recipes. In older times, plants that would sustain the population through the winters were cornerstones; various turnips such as the kålrot (rutabaga) (aptly named "swede" in British English) were gradually supplanted or complemented by the potato in the 18th century. A lack of distinct spices made everyday food rather bland by today's standards, although a number of local herbs and plants have been used since ancient times. This tradition is still present in today's Swedish dishes, which are still rather sparingly spiced.

Both before and after this period, some new Germanic dishes were also brought in by immigrants, such as people related to the Hanseatic League, settling in Stockholm, Visby, and Kalmar. Swedish traders and aristocrats naturally also picked up some food traditions in foreign countries; cabbage rolls (kåldolmar) being one example. An early version of kåldolmar was first published in 1765 in the fourth edition of Hjelpreda i Hushållningen för Unga Fruentimber by Cajsa Warg, though it was closer to the Turkish dolma than later dishes.

Husmanskost 
Swedish husmanskost denotes traditional Swedish dishes with local ingredients, the classical everyday Swedish cuisine. The word husmanskost stems from husman, meaning 'house owner', and the term was originally used for most kinds of simple countryside food outside of towns. Genuine Swedish husmanskost used predominantly local ingredients such as pork in all forms, fish, cereals, milk, potato, root vegetables, cabbage, onions, apples, berries etc.; beef and lamb were used more sparingly. Beside berries, apples are the most used traditional fruit, eaten fresh or served as apple pie, apple sauce, or apple cake. Time-consuming cooking methods such as redningar (roux) and långkok (literally 'long boil') are commonly employed and spices are sparingly used. Examples of Swedish husmanskost are pea soup (ärtsoppa), boiled and mashed carrots, potato and rutabaga served with pork (rotmos med fläsk), many varieties of salmon (such as gravlax, inkokt lax, fried, pickled), varieties of herring (most commonly pickled, but also fried, au gratin, etc.), fishballs (fiskbullar), meatballs (köttbullar), potato dumplings with meat or other ingredients (palt), potato pancake (raggmunk), varieties of porridge (gröt), a fried mix of pieces of potato, different kind of meats, sausages, bacon and onion (pytt i panna), meat stew with onion (kalops), and potato dumplings with a filling of onions and pork (kroppkakor). Many of the dishes would be considered comfort food for the nostalgic value.

Dishes akin to Swedish husmanskost and food traditions are found also in other Scandinavian countries; details may vary.

Sweden is part of the vodka belt and historically distilled beverages, such as brännvin and snaps, have been a traditional daily complement to food.
Consumption of wine in Sweden has increased during the last fifty years, partly at the expense of beer and stronger alcoholic beverages.
In many countries, locally produced wines are combined with local husmanskost.

Husmanskost has undergone a renaissance during the last decades as well known (or famous) Swedish chefs, such as Tore Wretman, have presented modernised variants of classical Swedish dishes. In this nouvel husman the amount of fat (which was needed to sustain hard manual labour in the old days) is reduced and some new ingredients are introduced. The cooking methods are tinkered with as well, in order to speed up the cooking process or enhance the nutritional value or flavour of the dishes. Many Swedish restaurateurs mix traditional husmanskost with a modern, gourmet approach.

Dishes 

Swedish traditional dishes, some of which are many hundreds of years old, others perhaps a century or less, are still a very important part of Swedish everyday meals, in spite of the fact that modern Swedish cuisine adopts many international dishes.

Internationally, the most renowned Swedish culinary tradition is the smörgåsbord and, at Christmas, the julbord, including well-known Swedish dishes such as gravlax and meatballs.
In Sweden, traditionally, Thursday has been "soup day" because the maids had half the day off and soup was easy to prepare in advance. One of the most traditional Swedish soups, ärtsoppa, is still served in many restaurants and households every Thursday, a tradition since the Middle Ages. Ärtsoppa is a yellow pea soup, commonly served with pancakes as dessert. This is a simple meal, a very thick soup, basically consisting of boiled yellow peas, a little onion, salt and small pieces of pork. It is often served with mustard and followed by a dessert of thin pancakes (pannkakor). The Swedish Armed Forces also serve their conscripts pea soup and pancakes every Thursday.

Potatoes are eaten year-round as the main source of carbohydrates, and are a staple in many traditional dishes. Not until the last 50 years have pasta or rice become common on the dinner table.
There are several different kinds of potatoes; the most appreciated is the "new potato", a potato which ripens in early summer and is enjoyed at the traditional midsummer feast. New potatoes at midsummer are served with pickled herring, chives, and sour cream, and the first strawberries of the year are traditionally served as dessert.

The most highly regarded mushroom in Sweden is the chanterelle, which is considered a delicacy. The chanterelle is usually served as a side dish together with steaks, or fried with onions and sauce served on an open sandwich. Second to the chanterelle, and considered almost as delicious, is the porcini mushroom, or karljohansvamp, named after Charles XIV John (Karl XIV Johan) who introduced its use as food.

In August, at the traditional feast known as kräftskiva, crayfish party, Swedes eat large amounts of crayfish, boiled and then marinated in a broth with salt, a little bit of sugar, and a large amount of dill weed.

Some Swedish dishes are:

Meals 
Meals consists of breakfast in the early morning (frukost), a light lunch before noon (lunch), and a heavy dinner (middag) around six or seven in the evening. It is also common to have a snack, often a sandwich or fruit, in between meals (mellanmål). Most Swedes also have a coffee break in the afternoon, often together with a pastry (fika). In all primary schools, and most, but not all secondary schools, a hot meal is served at lunch as part of Sweden's welfare state. According to Swedish school law, this meal has to be nutrient-dense.

Breakfast 

Breakfast usually consists of open sandwiches (smörgås), possibly on crisp bread (knäckebröd). The sandwich is most often buttered, with toppings such as hard cheese, cold cuts, caviar, messmör (a Norwegian sweet spread made from butter and whey), ham (skinka), and tomatoes or cucumber. Filmjölk (fermented milk/buttermilk), or sometimes yogurt, is also traditional breakfast food, usually served in a bowl with cereals such as cornflakes.  Muesli, or porridge (gröt) is sometimes eaten at breakfast, made of oatmeal or cream of wheat, eaten with milk and jam or cinnamon with sugar. Common drinks for breakfast are milk, juice, tea, or coffee. Swedes are among the most avid milk and coffee drinkers in the world.

Swedes sometimes have sweet toppings on their breads, such as jam (like the French and Americans), or chocolate (like the Danes), although many older Swedes chose not to use these sweet toppings. However, orange marmalade on white bread is common, usually with morning coffee or tea.

Many traditional kinds of Swedish bread, such as sirapslimpa (less fashionable today, but still very popular) are somewhat sweetened in themselves, baked with small amounts of syrup. Like in many other European countries, there are also many non-sweetened breads, often made with sourdough (surdeg). Swedish breads may be made from wholegrain, fine grain, or anything in between, and there are white, brown, and very dark (like in Finland) varieties which are all common. Barkis or bergis is a localised version of challah usually made without eggs and at first only available in Stockholm and Göteborg where Jews first settled but now available elsewhere.

Main courses

Seafood 
Fish and other seafood are an important part of Swedish cuisine. Farmed salmon from Norway has become increasingly popular. Pickled, sweetened herring, inlagd sill, is a traditional Swedish appetizer. Shrimp and lobster are specialties of the Skagerrak coast. Surströmming is a fermented Baltic herring famous for its pungent aroma, both loved and hated.

Desserts 

Common desserts include:

Pastries and treats

Kaffebröd (coffee bread) 
Bakelser and other types of kaffebröd (or more colloquially fikabröd) are various forms of pastries, cake, cookies, and buns that are usually consumed with coffee (see fika). Popular kinds of kaffebröd available in a traditional Swedish konditori (coffee shop / pâtisserie) include:

Treats 

During the winter holidays, traditional candy and pastries include:

Other typical Swedish candy includes:

Drinks 
Sweden is in second place among the heaviest coffee-drinking countries in the world. Milk consumption in Sweden is also very high, second only to Finland. Milk is bought in milk cartons;  Tetra Pak, the world's largest maker of milk cartons, was founded in Sweden. Milk is considered the standard drink to have with meals during weekdays in many families, for both children and adults.

Christmas beverages

Sweet drinks

Liquor 

The production of liquor has a tradition dating back to the 18th century and was at a high in the 1840s. Since the 1880s, the state-owned Systembolaget has a monopoly on selling spirits with more than 3.5% ABV, limiting access. Hembränt (moonshine) used to be made in rural Sweden, but production has lessened in recent years due to more liberal rules for the import of alcohol as well as increased smuggling.

Punsch is a traditional liqueur in Sweden that was immensely popular during the 19th century. It was adopted as the drink of choice by university students, and many traditional songs from that time are about the consumption of punsch or are meant to be sung during the collective festivities that were part of the cultural life in the universities' student associations at the time and still is.

Beer 

Beer is also widely consumed in Sweden and the typical Swedish beer is lager of a bright and malty kind. The brands Pripps Blå and Norrlands Guld are common examples. In the last few decades, many small breweries (microbreweries) have emerged all over Sweden offering a wide range of styles and brands. Nils Oscar Brewery, Dugges Ale och Porterbryggeri and Närke Kulturbryggeri are examples of these young Swedish microbreweries. Many microbreweries in Sweden are inspired by the US craft beer movement, brewing American styles or styles commonly associated with American craft breweries, e.g. American Pale Ale and American IPA.

Food and society 
Brödinstitutet ('The Bread Institute') once campaigned with a quotation from the Swedish National Board of Health and Welfare, recommending eating six to eight slices of bread daily. Drinking milk has also been recommended and campaigned for by the Swedish National Board of Health and Welfare; it is often recommended to drink two to three glasses of milk per day. A survey conducted on behalf of Mjölkfrämjandet, an organisation promoting consumption of Swedish milk, concluded that 52% of Swedes surveyed drink milk at least once a day, usually one glass with lunch and another glass or two in the evening or morning.

Low-fat products, wholemeal bread and other alternatives are common; grocery stores usually sell milk in four or five different fat levels, from 3% to 0.1%.

See also 

 Sami cuisine
 Cuisine of Finland
 Cuisine of Norway
 Culture of Sweden
 Danish cuisine
 Icelandic cuisine
 List of Christmas dishes
 Swedish festivities

References

Further reading 
 Schildt-Lundgren, Margareta (2000) Simply Swedish. 
 Widenfelt, Sam, ed. (1950) Swedish Food. Gothenburg: Esselte

External links 

 VisitSweden ‒ Sweden's official website for tourism and travel information ‒ Gastronomy in Sweden
 Sweden.se ‒ Swedish culinary classics ‒ recipes with history and originality
 Gretchen's Cookbook ‒ Swedish Recipes